is a train station on the  Osaka Metro Nagahori Tsurumi-ryokuchi Line in Nishi-ku, Osaka, Japan.

Lines
Osaka Metro
Nagahori Tsurumi-ryokuchi Line (Station Number: N14)

Layout

Nagahori Tsurumi-ryokuchi Line

Osaka Metro stations
Railway stations in Japan opened in 1997